HMS Imogen was a  built for the Royal Navy in the mid-1930s. During the Spanish Civil War of 1936–1939, the ship enforced the arms blockade imposed by Britain and France on both sides as part of the Mediterranean Fleet. After the start of the Second World War the ship was transferred to Home Fleet and participated in the Norwegian Campaign in April 1940. Imogen sank two German submarines before her own sinking following an accidental collision in July 1940.

Description
The I-class ships were improved versions of the preceding H-class. They were powered by two Parsons geared steam turbines, each driving one propeller shaft, using steam provided by three Admiralty three-drum boilers. Their crew numbered 145 officers and ratings.

The ships mounted four 4.7-inch (120 mm) Mark IX guns in single mounts, designated 'A', 'B', 'X' and 'Y' from bow to stern. For anti-aircraft (AA) defence, they had two quadruple mounts for the 0.5 inch Vickers Mark III machine gun. The I class was fitted with two above-water quintuple torpedo tube mounts amidships for  torpedoes. One depth charge rack and two throwers were fitted; 16 depth charges were originally carried, but this increased to 35 shortly after the war began. The I-class ships were fitted with the ASDIC sound detection system to locate submarines underwater.

Construction
The ship was ordered on 30 October 1935 from Hawthorn Leslie at Hebburn under the 1935 Naval Programme. She was laid down on 18 January 1936, launched on 30 December 1936, as the seventh Royal Navy ship to carry this name, and completed on 2 June 1937, at a contract price of £256,917, excluding items supplied by Admiralty such as armaments and communications equipment.

Career
Imogen was assigned to the 3rd Destroyer Flotilla of the Mediterranean Fleet upon commissioning and was initially based in Malta. Transferred to Gibraltar, she patrolled Spanish waters enforcing the policies of the Non-Intervention Committee during 1938. The ship was given a brief refit in Malta from 17 October–28 November 1938 and another at Sheerness Dockyard in August 1939.

At the beginning of the Second World War Imogen returned to the Mediterranean on 3 September, but she was transferred to the Western Approaches Command for convoy escort duties two days later when Italy did not enter the war. 

Together with the entire 3rd Destroyer Flotilla, the ship was transferred to the Home Fleet in October. 
 Whilst escorting merchant ships to Barry, Imogen rescued survivors from the ships Louisiane and Bretagne. 
 She was refitted at Liverpool between 20 October and 7 November 1939 and then rejoined Home Fleet. 
 With her sister  and the destroyer , Imogen sank  after it had been spotted by the British submarine  on 25 February 1940. 
 During the Norwegian Campaign, the ship searched unsuccessfully for German ships, escorted ships of Home Fleet and troopships carrying Norwegian Army units from Kirkenes and Alta to Sjøvegan in mid-April. 
 In mid-June, she escorted the aircraft carrier  to Bermuda to work up.

Sinking

Off Duncansby Head during the night of 16 July 1940, Imogen collided with the light cruiser  in thick fog in the North Sea whilst bound for Scapa Flow. She was badly damaged, caught fire, and sank at position .  Glasgow rescued 10 officers and 125 ratings; 19 men were killed in the collision.

Notes

Bibliography
 
 
 
 
 
 
 
 
 

 

I-class destroyers of the Royal Navy
Ships built on the River Tyne
1936 ships
World War II destroyers of the United Kingdom
World War II shipwrecks in the North Sea
Maritime incidents in July 1940
Ships sunk in collisions